Goslee Creek is a  long 1st order tributary to Love Creek, in Sussex County, Delaware.

Variant names
According to the Geographic Names Information System, it has also been known historically as:  
Gosling Creek

Course
Goslee Creek rises on the Black Hog Gut divide about 0.25 miles north of Jimtown in Sussex County, Delaware.  Goslee Creek then flows south-southwest to meet Love Creek within Goslee Millpond.

Watershed
Goslee Creek drains  of area, receives about 45.4 in/year of precipitation, has a topographic wetness index of 653.10 and is about 10.3% forested.

See also
List of rivers of Delaware

References 

Rivers of Delaware